Ankazomiriotra is a rural municipality in Madagascar. It belongs to the district of Mandoto, which is a part of Vakinankaratra Region. The population of the commune was estimated to be approximately 34,000 in 2001 commune census.

Primary and junior level secondary education are available in town. The majority 75% of the population of the commune are farmers, while an additional 25% receives their livelihood from raising livestock. The most important crop is rice, while other important products are maize and cassava.

The Provincial road RIP 143 connects Ankazomiriotra with Fidirana.

References and notes 

Populated places in Vakinankaratra